Kuraishi is a Japanese surname. Notable people with the surname include:

, Japanese actor
, Japanese basketball coach

Other people
Jassim Karim Kuraishi (born 1938), Iraqi sprinter
Monjur Kader Kuraishi, Bangladeshi politician
KPY Kuraishi, Indian actor

See also
Kuraishi, Aomori, a former village in Sannohe District, Aomori Prefecture, Japan

Japanese-language surnames